Alois Ferdinand Hrdlička, after 1918 changed to Aleš Hrdlička (March 30, 1869 – September 5, 1943), was a Czech anthropologist who lived in the United States after his family had moved there in 1881. He was born in Humpolec, Bohemia (today in the Czech Republic).

Life and career
Hrdlička was born at Humpolec house 393 on 30 March 1869 and baptized Catholic the next day at the Kostel svatého Mikuláše. His mother, Karolína Hrdličková, educated her child herself; his skills and knowledge made it possible to skip the primary level of school. When he was 13, Hrdlička arrived in New York with his father Maxmilian Hrdlička on 10 September 1881 via the SS Elbe from Bremen. His mother and three younger siblings emigrated to the U.S. separately. After arrival, the promised job brought only a disappointment to his father who started working in a cigar factory along with teenaged Alois to earn living for the family with six other children. Young Hrdlička attended evening courses to improve his English, and at the age of 18, he decided to study medicine since he had suffered from tuberculosis and experienced the treatment difficulties of those times. In 1889, Hrdlička began studies at Eclectic Medical College and then continued at Homeopatic College in New York. To finish his medical studies, Hrdlička sat for exams in Baltimore in 1894. At first, he worked in the Middletown asylum for mentally affected where he learnt of anthropometry. In 1896, Hrdlička left for Paris, where he started to work as an anthropologist with other experts of then establishing field of science.

Between 1898 and 1903, during his scientific travel across America, Hrdlička became the first scientist to spot and document the theory of human colonization of the American continent from east Asia, which he claimed was only some 3,000 years ago. He argued that the Indians migrated across the Bering Strait from Asia, supporting this theory with detailed field research of skeletal remains as well as studies of the people in Mongolia, Tibet, Siberia, Alaska, and Aleutian Islands. The findings backed up the argument which later contributed to the theory of global origin of human species that was awarded by the Thomas Henry Huxley Award in 1927.

Aleš Hrdlička founded and became the first curator of physical anthropology of the U.S. National Museum, now the Smithsonian Institution National Museum of Natural History in 1903. He was the founder of the American Journal of Physical Anthropology in 1918.  After he stepped down, the journal volume number, which had reached Volume 29 in 1942, was restarted at Volume 1 in 1943.

Hrdlička was involved in examining a skull to determine that it belonged to Adolph Ruth, who was sensationalized in the press when Ruth went missing in Arizona in 1931 searching for the legendary Lost Dutchman's Gold Mine.

He always sponsored his fellow expatriates and also donated the institution of anthropology in Prague, which was founded in 1930 by his co-explorer , in his natal country (the institution later took his name). Between 1936 and 1938, Hrdlička led the recovery of over 50 mummies from caves on Kagamil Island.

European hypothesis

Hrdlička was interested in the origin of human beings. He was a critic of hominid evolution as well as the Asia hypothesis, as he claimed there was little evidence to go on for those theories. He dismissed finds such as the Ramapithecus which were labeled as hominids by most scientists, instead believing that they were nothing more than fossil apes, unrelated to human ancestry.

In a lecture on "The Origin of Man", delivered for the American Association for the Advancement of Science, at Cincinnati, Ohio, Hrdlička said that the cradle of man is not in Central Asia but in Central Europe, as Europe is the earliest known location where human skeletal remains have been found.

Hrdlička was almost alone in his views. The European hypothesis fell into decline and is now considered an obsolete scientific theory which has been replaced by the Multiregional hypothesis and the Out of Africa hypothesis.

Controversy and criticism
More recently, Hrdlička's methods have come under scrutiny and criticism with regard to his treatment of Native American remains. An AP newswire article, "Mexico Indian Remains Returned From NY Museum For Burial" from November 17, 2009, recounted his study of Mexico's tribal races, including the beheading of still-decomposing victims of a massacre of Yaqui Indians and removing the flesh from the skulls as part of these studies. He also threw out the corpse of an infant that was found in a cradleboard but forwarded this artifact along with the skulls and other remains to New York's American Museum of Natural History. While these practices are not inconsistent with other ethnographers and human origin researchers of that era, the moral and ethical ramifications of these research practices continues to be debated today. His work has also been linked to the development of American eugenics laws.

Family
On August 6, 1896 Hrdlička married German-American Marie Stickler (whom he had courted since 1892), daughter of Phillip Jakob Strickler from Edenkoben, Bavaria, who immigrated to Manhattan in 1855. Marie died in 1918 of complications of diabetes. In the summer of 1920 Hrdlička married a second time; his fiancée was another German-American woman, Wilhelmina "Mina" Mansfield.

References

General literature 
 Redman, Samuel J. Bone Rooms: From Scientific Racism to Human Prehistory in Museums. Cambridge: Harvard University Press. 2016.

External links

 
 
 EMuseum short biography Minnesota State University
 Biography of Ales Hrdlicka at American Journal of Physical Anthropology
 Register to the Papers of Aleš Hrdlička, National Anthropological Archives, Smithsonian Institution
 National Academy of Sciences Biographical Memoir

1869 births
1943 deaths
20th-century Mesoamericanists
American anthropologists
American Mesoamericanists
American people of Bohemian descent
Austro-Hungarian emigrants to the United States
Czech anthropologists
Mesoamerican anthropologists
People from Humpolec
People from the Kingdom of Bohemia
Pre-Columbian scholars
Smithsonian Institution people